The 1907 Spring Hill Badgers football team represented the Spring Hill College as an independent during the 1907 college football season. The team was led by its first head coach, E. G. Maxon. Captain Walsh was injured in the game.

Schedule

References

Spring Hill
Spring Hill Badgers football seasons
College football winless seasons
Spring Hill Badgers football